Haunts may refer to:

 Haunted attraction (disambiguation), several meanings
 Haunts (band), a British rock band
 Haunts (album), a 2007 album by Bark Bark Bark 
 "Haunts" (The Shield), a 2007 episode of the TV series The Shield
 Haunts (film), a 1976 American horror film
 Haunts (Wraith: The Oblivion), a 1994 tabletop game book

See also
 Haunt (disambiguation)
 Haunted (disambiguation)
 Haunter (disambiguation)
 The Haunting (disambiguation)